This article refers to sports broadcasting contracts in Vietnam. For a list of rights in other countries, see Sports television broadcast contracts.

Current contracts

Multi-discipline events

Football

Tennis

Badminton

Former contracts

Multi-discipline events
Summer Olympic Games
1996? - now: The Vietnam Television (VTV)
2008, 2012 : The VTC Digital Television Network (through Vietnam Multimedia Corporation; VTC)
2012: ESPN Asia
Winter Olympic Games
2018: The Vietnam Television (VTV)
Asian Games
2002? - 2010: The Vietnam Television (VTV)
2014: Saigontourist Cable Television Company Limited (SCTV)
2018: Radio the Voice of Vietnam (VOV) & VTC Digital Television Network
2022: FPT
Southeast Asian Games
1995–present: The Vietnam Television (VTV)
2005–present: The Vietnam Multimedia Corporation (VTC)
2017–present: The Ho Chi Minh City Television (HTV)
2009–present: VTVcab
2013–present: VOV
2017: K+
2021: FPT

Football

Television

FIFA

National teams 
World Cup
1994–2022: Vietnam Television (VTV)
2006–2010: The Vietnam Multimedia Corporation (VTC)
1978-2010, 2018: Ho Chi Minh City Television (HTV)
FIFA Confederations Cup
2003, 2013: HTV
2005, 2009: VTV
FIFA U-20 World Cup
2013: HTV (from the semi-finals)
2017: VTV (matches with U-20 Vietnam and from the quarter-finals)

Clubs 
International Champions Cup
2006: VTC
2007–2008, 2015: VTV
2015–2016: Saigontourist Cable Television Company Limited (SCTV)
2017–present: K+
2019: FPT Telecom, Vietnam Posts and Telecommunications Group (MyTV)
2022: VTVCab (planned)

AFC

National teams 

FIFA World Cup - AFC qualification
1996–present: Vietnam Television (VTV)
2015-2018: K+ (Vietnam's Away Match, World Cup 2018 qualification)
2019–present: Next Media (VTC (2019), VTV (2021))
AFC U-23 Asian Cup - Qualification
2015: K+
2017: VTV
2019: Next Media (VTC)
Asian Cup
2007–2011: The Vietnam Multimedia Corporation (VTC)
Present: Fox Sports Asia (all matches)
2019: The Vietnam Television
2023: FPT Telecom
U-23
2016–present: The Vietnam Television
2022–2024: FPT Telecom
U-19
2014–present: The Vietnam Television
2020–2024: FPT Telecom
U-17
2020–2024: FPT Telecom
U-17 Women
2020–2024: FPT Telecom
U-19 Women
2020–2024: FPT Telecom

Clubs 

AFC Champions League
2004: VTV
2007, 2015-2016: The Vietnam Multimedia Corporation (VTC)
2016-2020: Fox Sports Asia
2021–2024: FPT Telecom
AFC Cup
2010: VCTV (now on VTVcab)
2016-2020: Fox Sports Asia
2021–2024: FPT Telecom
Japanese J. League
J1
2013: VTVcab, The Vietnam Multimedia Corporation (VTC)
2020–Present: YouTube
J2
2020–Present: YouTube
Australian A-League
2017–present: Saigontourist Cable Television Company Limited (SCTV)
 Korean K-League
 2020–Present: COPA90 (Digital: YouTube)
Thai League 1
2022-2023rounds 16-30, 2023-2024: VTVcab

AFF

National teams 

AFF Championship
1996–2020: Vietnam Television (VTV)
2008-2016: Fox Sports Asia
2020: Next Media
2022–present: FPT
AFF U-22 Championship
 2019: Vietnam Television (VTV)

Clubs
ASEAN Club Championship
 2003: VTV

Vietnam

Clubs 

V.League 1
Mid 1990s-present: Vietnam Television (VTV)
2005–2022: VTVcab
2010-2016: Vietnam Multimedia Corporation (VTC)
2012-2015: Quang Nam Radio Television (QRT) (only Quang Nam FC home match)
2015 - 2017: Binh Duong Radio Television (BTV) (only Becamex Bình Dương F.C home match)
2012-2019: Ho Chi Minh City Television (HTV) (only Sài Gòn Xuân Thành, Ho Chi Minh City FC, Sài Gòn FC home match)
2011-2016: AVG
2023-2027: FPT
V.League 2
2016–2022: VTVcab
2015–2022: Dak Lak Radio Television (DRT) (only CLB Đắk Lắk home match)
2015: Tay Ninh Radio Television (TTV11) (only CLB Tây Ninh home match)
2015: Binh Phuoc Radio Television (BPTV) (only CLB Bình Phước home match)
2023-2027: FPT
Vietnamese National Football Cup
2010-2022: VTVcab
2012-2015: Ho Chi Minh City Television (only Sài Gòn Xuân Thành match)
2023-2027: FPT
Vietnamese National Football Super Cup
2013–present: Vietnam Television (VTV)

UEFA

National teams 

European Championships
Men's/Boys
A-team
2000–present: Vietnam Television (VTV)
2008-2012: Vietnam Multimedia Corporation (VTC)
U-21
2017–present: UEFA (Digital: YouTube (2017 only) and UEFA.tv)
U-17 and U-19
2016–present: UEFA (Digital: YouTube (2016-May 2019) and UEFA.tv (July 2019 – present))
Women's/Girls
A-team
2017: UEFA (Digital: YouTube (2017 only))
2022 (originally 2021): TBA
U-17 and U-19
2016–present: UEFA (Digital: YouTube (2016-May 2019) and UEFA.tv (July 2019 – present))
UEFA European Qualifiers (including Euro and World Cup qualification)
2014: Vietnam Television
2014–2018: VTVcab, AVG
2019–2022: VTVcab, K+
2023-2028: VTV
UEFA Nations League:
2018-2022: VTVcab, K+
2023-2028: VTV

Clubs

UEFA Champions League
1998-2017: Vietnam Television
2015-2017: VTVcab
2012–2021: K+
2021-2024: FPT
UEFA Europa League
2012–2021: K+
2012-2017: Vietnam Television
2021-2024: FPT
UEFA Europa Conference League
2021-2024: FPT
UEFA Super Cup
2012-2021: K+
2014-2015 Vietnam Television
2013-2016: VTVcab
2021-2024: FPT
English Premier League
1996-2007,2013-2016: Vietnam Television
2010–present: K+
2010-2019: VTVcab, Saigontourist Cable Television Company Limited (SCTV)
2010-2016: Hanoi Radio Television,Ho Chi Minh City Television
2016-2019: Ho Chi Minh City Television, FPT Telecom
English FA Cup/Community Shield
2000s: Vietnam Television
2015–present: Saigontourist Cable Television Company Limited (SCTV)
2018-2021, 2021-2024: FPT Telecom
2020-2021: VieON
2018-2020: Vietnam Posts and Telecommunications Group (MyTV).
English Football League Championship/EFL Cup (Football League Cup)
2012–2015: Vietnam Multimedia Corporation (VTC)
2015-2017: SCTV
2018–present: VTVcab
Spanish La Liga
2007-2009: Vietnam Television
2010-2018: K+
2012–present: Saigontourist Cable Television Company Limited (SCTV), VTVcab
German Bundesliga
2011-2018: VTVcab, Saigontourist Cable Television Company Limited (SCTV), Ho Chi Minh City Television, Hanoi Radio and Television
2015-2020: Fox Sports Asia
2020-2021: Next Media: (Vietnam Television, VTVcab, VTC3, Binh Duong Radio Television)
2021-2025: Next Media: (VTVcab)
German DFL-Supercup
2012-2017: VTVcab, Saigontourist Cable Television Company Limited (SCTV)
2015-2019: Fox Sports Asia
2020-2021: Next Media: (Vietnam Television, VTVcab, VTC3, Binh Duong Radio Television)
2021-2025: Next Media: (VTVcab)
German DFB-Pokal
2019-2022: YouTube
Italian Serie A
2002-2010, 2021-2024: Ho Chi Minh City Television
2007-2010: Vietnam Television
2012-2015, 2021-2024: VTVcab
2012-2018: Saigontourist Cable Television Company Limited (SCTV)
2018-2021: FPT Telecom
French Ligue 1
2012-2015: VTVcab, Saigontourist Cable Television Company Limited (SCTV)
2015-2020: Saigontourist Cable Television Company Limited (SCTV)
2018–present: TV5Monde
2021-2024: VTVcab
French Ligue 2
2022-2024: VTVCab (only Pau FC matches)
Dutch Eredivisie
2015–2018: Fox Sports Asia
2019-2021: Ho Chi Minh City Television, VTVcab
2020–present: VieON
Portuguese Liga NOS
2000s: ESPN Star Sports
 Danish Superliga,
 2019–present (originally from June 2020): Fox Sports Asia
 Danish DBU Pokalen
 2019–present: Fox Sports Asia (three matches (both semi finals and a final))
Scotland Premiership
2014–2017: SCTV
 Scotland Championship
 2015–2017: SCTV

CONMEBOL

National team 

Copa América
 2007: VTC, HCMC TV (HTV)
 2011-2016: Saigontourist Cable Television Company Limited (SCTV)
 2019: MyTV, K+, FPT Telecom
 2020: VTVCab

Clubs 
Brazilian Campeonato Brasileiro Série A
2018-2019: VTVcab, Ho Chi Minh City Television
2018 and 2019: YouTube
2020 and 2021: Fanatiz
Copa Libertadores
present: VTVCab
Copa Sudamerica
present: VTVCab

CONCACAF

National teams 
 CONCACAF Gold Cup
2019, 2021: CONCACAF (Digital: ConcacafGO)
 CONCACAF Nations League
 2019–present: CONCACAF (Digital: ConcacafGO)

Club 

American Major League Soccer
2018-pressnt: Saigontourist Cable Television Company Limited (SCTV)
 CONCACAF Champions League
 2020–present: YouTube

CAF

National teams
FIFA World Cup - Qualifications
2021: VieON

Other

 King's Cup 2019
 2019: Next Media (VTC) (only Vietnam match)
 Ho Chi Minh City Football Cup (BV Cup/LG Cup):
 2006: VTV, HTV

Radio

FIFA

National teams 

 FIFA World Cup
 2018: VOV

AFC

National teams 

 FIFA World Cup - AFC Qualification
 2019: Next Media (VOV)
 U-23 Asian Cup - Qualifications
 2019: Next Media (VOV)

UEFA

Club 

 UEFA Champions League
 2013–2016: VOV, Talksport International
 Premier League
 2013–2016: VOV, Talksport
 2013–present: Talksport International
FA Women's Super League
 Present: Talksport International

Combat sports

Boxing 
Dream Boxing: DAZN: October 2022 to October 2025, all fights

Kickboxing 
King of Kings: DAZN: October 2022 to October 2025, all fights

Mixed Martial Arts 
Bushido MMA: DAZN: October 2022 to October 2025, all fights
 Ultimate Fighting Championship
 2013–2021: Fox Sports Asia
 2022–2025: K+
 ONE Championship
 Present: Ho Chi Minh City Television

Muay Thai 
 MAX Muay Thai
 2017-2018: VTC & Let's Viet (VTC9/SCTV4)

Futsal
FIFA Futsal World Cup
2016: K+
2021: VTV
Futsal Vietnam League
2017–present: Vietnam Multimedia Corporation (VTC)

Baseball 

 World Baseball Classic
 2017–2021 : Fox Sports Asia
 2022–present : Disney+ Hotstar
 Major League Baseball
 –2021 : Fox Sports Asia
 2022–present : Disney+ Hotstar
 Korea Baseball Organization
 2020–2021 : Fox Sports Asia
 2022–present : Disney+ Hotstar

Basketball
NBA
2017–2022: VTVcab
2022–2025: FPT Telecom
ASEAN Basketball League
Present: FPT Telecom
Vietnam Basketball League
2016–present: VTVcab
2019–2022: FPT Telecom

Golf
Ryder Cup
2021: VTVCab
European Tour
Present: K+,VTVcab
PGA Tour
Present: K+
-2021: Fox Sports Asia
2023-2025: VTVCab
LIV Golf
2023-2025: K+

Motor Racing
Formula One
2021-2029: K+
World Rally Championship
Present: K+
MotoGP
2021: K+
2022–present: FPT

Rugby

Union 

Rugby World Cup
2015: Fox Sports Asia
Six Nations Championship
2017–Present: Discovery
English Premiership
Present: Discovery
Pro14
Present: Discovery
Currie Cup
Present: Discovery
 World Rugby Sevens Series
 Present: YouTube

Volleyball
Men's and Women's Nations League
2022–2024: The Vietnam Multimedia Corporation (VTC)
Men's and Women's Club World Championship
FIVB Volleyball Women's World Championship
present: Ho Chi Minh City Television
FIVB Volleyball Women's World Cup
present: Ho Chi Minh City Television
FIVB World Grand Champions Cup
present: Ho Chi Minh City Television

Tennis
Wimbledon
-2021: Fox Sports Asia
2022–present: Disney+ Hotstar
Australian Open
-2021: Fox Sports Asia
2022–present: K+
French Open
-2021: Fox Sports Asia
2022–present: VTVCab
U.S. Open
2009: VTVcab
-2021: Fox Sports Asia
2022–present: Disney+ Hotstar
ATP World Tour
2010-2015: SCTV
2009–2015, 2020–2023: VTVcab
2015-2023: K+
WTA tour
2016-2018: K+
2010s–2019: VTVcab
Davis Cup
2015-2018:
2019–present: Ho Chi Minh City Television
Fed Cup
2019: Fox Sports Asia

Others 

 ICC
 -2021: Fox Sports Asia
 2022–present: Disney+ Hotstar
 Caribbean Premier League
 2020–present: 1PlaySports (Digital: YouTube)

Esports

See also 
List of Television Programme broadcast by Vietnam Television
Television and mass media in Vietnam

References

Vietnam
Vietnamese television programmes
Telecommunications in Asia
Telecommunications in Vietnam
Television in Asia